Arora is a community of Punjab, comprising both Hindus and Sikhs. The name is derived from their native place Aror. In 711, the Arora people left Aror and started to settle in the cities of Punjab.

Historically, the Arora section of the Khatri community had been principally found in West Punjab, in the districts to the south and west of Lahore. Scott Cameron Levi, believes that they are a "sub-caste of the Khatris".

After Partition of India, Punjabis who migrated from erstwhile West Punjab were mostly Khatris and Aroras. Studies reveal that "Arora Khatri, Bedi, Ahluwalia etc. are some of the important castes among the Punjabis".

Mughal decline and Afghan Revival
On 13 April 1752, Lahore and Multan of Punjab were ceded to Ahmad Shah Durrani after the fall of Kaura Mal in the battlefield and retreat of Adina Beg. Afghanistan was the conduit for the trade between Central Asia and India. Grain trade in Afghanistan was in the hands of the Hindu Punjabi Arora/Khatris. Reportedly, they gave loans to the Durrani rulers to carry out military expeditions in India. Moreover, the disappointed princes of India "encouraged Zaman Shah Durrani to invade the subcontinent and overthrow the British" in 1798.

To restrict the Afghans in Punjab, Hindu Diwan Kaura Mal Arora "died while fighting against the army of Ahmed Shah Durrani on March 6, 1752". He was the Governor of Multan and had also served as the Minister of Lahore twice. Earlier, he led the Lahore Darbar and "made a joint-attack on Multan in 1749", along the Sikhs led by Jassa Singh. Post his victory over Multan, "Diwan Kaura Mall was given the title of Maharaja Bahadur" by the Mughals.

Prior to the British colonial rule, Aroras were one the three main money-lending castes of Punjab. The Aroras were often subjected to oppression and humiliation by peasant communities in muslim-dominated areas of Punjab. Socially discriminatory laws were also passed against them. According to Sugata Bose, it was only "'when British rule freed him from restraint and armed him with the power of the law ... [that] he became as oppressive as he had been submissive'". Their traditional occupations were shopkeeping and moneylending in late pre-colonial and colonial times and even as of 2009 many were prominent shopkeepers in Punjab.

British Colonial Era

Pettigrew notes that in the 19th century, the Aroras were working as shopkeepers and small traders within the Sikh community in Punjab. During the British Raj, in some parts of Punjab their population was so high that they had to seek employment outside their traditional occupations shopkeeping, accountancy and money-lending For the Hindu merchant castes, Agarwal Banias, Khatris and Aroras, Timber trade was also one of the trades they followed before 1900. However, since 1900 the smallest merchant sect, the Suds, started this trade and later dominated it in eastern Punjab.

The Amritsar Gazetteer says:

The Hoshiarpur Gazetteer says: 

Uttaradhi (north), Dakhanadhi (south) and Dahre (west) are three major sub-groups of the Arora people based on territorial differentiations. Before the independence of India, Arora used to marry in their own sub-group i.e. Uttradhi, Dakkhna or Dahra but after the independence, spheres of permissible arranged matrimonial alliances were widened to include other sub-groups of Arora.

British ethnographer Denzil Ibbetson observed that Arora-Khatris were centered in Multan and Derajat (region consisting of Dera Ismail Khan and Dera Ghazi Khan) which are now part of Punjab and Khyber Pakhtunkhwa regions of modern-day Pakistan. They conducted business throughout Afghanistan and Central Asia.

Post-Independence

In the census of 1951, Aroras that were settled in Punjab returned their caste names as Khatris, Arora Khatris, Arorae, Rore, Aror, Rora Khatris, Arore, Aror Khatris etc. Some of the Aroras simply returned their caste names with Arora sub-caste names such as Arya, Ahuja, Batheja, Bathla, Chawla, Chhabra, Dang, Juneja, Jadeja, Taneja, Upneja, Wadhwa etc.

According to the Commission Reports by Justice Gurnam Singh (1990) and Justice K.C. Gupta (2012), Arora is a forward caste socially, educationally and economically. It was reported that "despite of being uprooted from their homeland",  Arora community has high literacy rate. An economic survey conducted by Maharishi Dayanand University states that Arora/Khatri people have good representation both in government as well as private sector. They are both in business, services and other fields. They are "economically well-off and not dependent on money-lending or shopkeeping". They are engaged as "doctors, engineers, administrators and are represented in white-collar jobs". The  Arora were divided in two main sub groups, namely Hindu Arora and Sikh Arora depending upon the religion pursued.

Punita Arora became the first lady Lieutenant General of the Indian Army in 2004.

As of 2009, many Aroras were prominent shopkeepers in several cities of Punjab including Amritsar. McLeod adds that they played prominent role in the Singh Sabha movement. Aroras such as Vir Singh and Mehtab Singh were influential within the Sikh community.

In Haryana, a majority of Aroras follow Hinduism while some follow Sikhism.

Culture

McLeod notes that marriages between Aroras and the Khatris are common.

According to the University of Utah sociologist, Bam Dev Sharda, in the "status allocation in village India", the Aroras are considered a mercantile caste belonging to the Vaishya varna - like the Khatris, Agarwal, Bania and Ahluwalia, and they claim "twice-born" status. So does historian Kenneth Jones by citing Denzil Ibbetson's study.

According to the University of Toronto anthropologist, Nicola Mooney, the Aroras are of Kshatriya varna, along with the Khatris. Similarly, Grant Evans describes Arora as a "sub-group of the Khatri jati of the Kshatriya Varna".

According to one legend, the Aroras are of Kshatriya stock, but dissociated themselves from the other Kshatriyas and escaped prosecution by Parashurama, calling themselves aur (someone else).

In the opinion of a "Ford-Maxwell Professor of South Asian Studies" at Syracuse University, the merchant-type castes such as the Rajasthani Baniyas, Agarwals, Guptas, Mittals, Goels are twice born castes. However in Punjab, there is a large number of merchant type jatis, "Arora" being their generic name, both Hindu and Sikh, and they are not twice-born. Yet they share about the same status in the wide regional ranking". He calls this "deferred caste denial" which he explains as the rule that "hierarchy persists in the Hindu mind even where caste is denied in any of the senses and by any of the strategies adumbrated".

In the opinion of a Professor of Sociology at Lucknow University (India), "every Hindu is supposed to have a caste" and Aroras (including its sub-castes) are identified as a sub-division of the Khatris. It is noted that "whether Khattris belong to Kshatriya varna or Vaishya varna is a point of controversy". According to Ethne K. Marenco, the Jat Sikhs were placed at the top in the Sikh caste hierarchy, above the Khatri and Arora Sikhs. In contrast, per the Hindu traditions, "the Khatris and Aroras were accorded Kshatriya status", while "the status of the Jat Sikhs was equated with that of Shudras".

Majority of the male members of the Arya Samaj in the late 19th century Punjab came from the Arora and Khatri merchant castes. In Punjab, the Kshatriya castes who were hierarchically higher than the Aroras and Khatris had been disempowered and thus the Brahmins who had lost their patrons had to turn to these non-Kshatriya castes. Christophe Jaffrelot explains the attraction of these trading castes to the Arya Samaj as a means of social mobility associated with their prosperity during the British rule. He cites N.G.Barrier to show that the philosophy of the Arya Samaj founder, Dayananda Saraswati, was responsible for the aspirations of these Vaishya castes from Punjab to higher status:

In a study of cultural geography and pilgrimage in India, it was recorded that "Khatri-Aroras are surely among the most numerous Hindu caste groups" in the areas of Punjab and Delhi. Khatri-Arora along with Brahmans and Mercantile castes "dominated the total mass of pilgrims" at Badrinath Dham. Similarly, the total number of pilgrims at Haridwar and Jwalaji were also predominated by the Khatri-Arora. At Chintapurni pilgrim, the Arora was found to be numerically dominant pilgrim group particularly during the Shravan Ashtmi fair.

See also
Arora (surname)

References
Citations
 

Bibliography

Indian castes
Punjabi tribes
Social groups of Haryana
Social groups of Punjab, India
Social groups of Delhi
 
Indian surnames
People from Sukkur District